"Winners" is a song by Swedish singer Mohombi. The song was performed for the first time in Melodifestivalen 2020, where it made it to the final.

Charts

References

2020 singles
English-language Swedish songs
Melodifestivalen songs of 2020
Songs written by Jimmy Jansson
Songs written by Mohombi